Melrose Park may refer to:

Places

Australia
 Melrose Park, New South Wales
 Melrose Park, South Australia

United States
 Melrose Park (Fort Lauderdale), Florida
 Melrose Park, Illinois
 Melrose Park, Lexington, Kentucky
 Melrose Park, New York
 Melrose Park, Pennsylvania

Transportation
Melrose Park station (Illinois), a Metra train station in Melrose Park, Illinois
Melrose Park station (SEPTA), a SEPTA Regional Rail station in Melrose Park, Pennsylvania

See also
 Melrose (disambiguation)